The  is a 32-bit arcade system board developed jointly by Namco and Sony Computer Entertainment. Released in 1994, the System 11 is based on a prototype of the PlayStation, Sony's first home video game console, using a 512 KB operating system and several custom processors. The  is an upgraded version of the System 11 that was released in 1996, featuring faster processing power.

History
Namco's research managing director Shegeichi Nakamura met with Sony Computer Entertainment head Ken Kutaragi in 1993 to discuss the preliminary PlayStation specifications, with Namco subsequently developing the System 11 arcade board based on PlayStation hardware and Tekken as their answer to Sega's popular Virtua Fighter. Tekken was initially planned for the Namco System 22, after Namco heard Sega was developing Virtua Fighter 2 for their new Sega Model 2 board, before the development of Tekken was later moved to the System 11 after the meeting with Kutaragi. Tekken was the first game to use the System 11, and was initially released for arcades in September 1994, several months before the PlayStation's Japanese release in December 1994. 

Although the System 11 was technically inferior to the Sega Model 2 arcade board, its lower price made it an attractive prospect for smaller arcades. According to the June 1995 issue of Edge:

Technical specifications
Main CPU: MIPS R3000A 32-bit RISC processor @ 33.8688 MHz, Operating performance - 30 MIPS, Instruction Cache - 4KB
BUS: 132 MB/s.
OS ROM: 512 KB
Sound CPU: Namco C76 (Mitsubishi M37702)
Sound chip: Namco C352
Main RAM: 2 MB
Video VRAM: 2 MB
Sound RAM: 512 kB
Graphical Processor: 360,000 polygons/s, sprite/BG drawing, adjustable framebuffer, No line restriction, 4,000 8x8 pixel sprites with individual scaling and rotation, simultaneous backgrounds (parallax scrolling)
Sprite Effects: Rotation, Scaling up/down, Warping, Transparency, Fading, Priority, Vertical and Horizontal Line Scroll
Resolution: 256x224 - 640x480
Colors: 16.7 million colors, Unlimited CLUTs (Color Look-Up Tables)
Other Features: custom geometry engine, custom polygon engine, MJPEG decoder

Games

Notes

References

MIPS architecture
Namco arcade system boards